The Manitoba Liberal Party won seven out of 57 seats in the 1990 provincial election, making the party the third-largest in the legislature.  Some of the party's candidates have their own biography pages; information about others may be found here.

This page also provides information on Liberal Party candidates in by-elections between 1990 and 1995.

Concordia: Gunter Grosskamper

Grosskamper is a resident of Winnipeg.  He is 58 years old , and operates GENGRO Business Consulting Services.

Elmwood: Ed Price

Price stood as the Liberal candidate for Elmwood in the 1988 and 1990 elections.

There was an independent candidate named Edward G. Price in Winnipeg—Birds Hill in the 1984 federal election.  He was a business owner, and ran several advertisements in the Winnipeg Free Press, indicating his support for capital punishment, and his opposition to abortion, political patronage and deficit spending.  He received 549 votes (1.05%), finishing sixth against New Democratic Party incumbent Bill Blaikie.  It is not clear if this was the same person.

The Liberal candidate in Rupertsland in the 1986 provincial election was also named Ed Price.  He received 577 votes, finishing third against New Democratic Party incumbent Elijah Harper.  It is not clear if this was the same person.

Point Douglas: Errol Lewis

Lewis (died October 28, 1998) was a Black Canadian activist in Manitoba, Canada.  He served as President of the Manitoba Association of Rights and Liberties during the 1980s, and later worked with the Canadian Grain Commission as the assistant commissioner for Manitoba.

He finished second against George Hickes of the NDP in the 1990 election, losing by over 1,000 votes.

By-elections

Portage la Prairie, 15 September 1992: Helen Christoffersen
Christoffersen had been a teacher for 26 years before contesting the by-election.  She declined to give her age Vancouver Sun, 1 September 1992).  She received 1,995 votes (31.88%), finishing second against Progressive Conservative candidate Brian Pallister.

Christoffersen has been involved in environmental issues in the years since 1990.  In a 2000 Maclean's survey, she defended the private use of lawn chemicals by homeowners while criticizing the indiscriminate use of such chemicals by cities and large corporations.  In 2002, she participated in a report by the Manitoba Clean Environment Commission.

In 1996, it was reported that Christoffersen was working as a teacher for a Hutterite community near Portage la Prairie (Winnipeg Free Press, 24 May 1996).  She is still a resident of Portage la Prairie as of 2005.

Rupertsland, 21 September 1993: George Munroe

Munroe was born and raised in Camperville, Manitoba, the child of a caucasian father and a Saulteux mother.  He has three years of experience in the Canadian Navy.  Munroe is a veteran aboriginal activist in the province, who helped form the Manitoba Indian Brotherhood in 1967 and was executive director of the Indian-Métis Friendship Centre in the early 1970s.

Munroe was elected to the Winnipeg City Council in 1971, winning as a New Democrat in the Ross House ward.  When asked about his status as a community leader on election night, he was quoted as saying, "I believe I'll adhere to the old Indian concept where you have leaders for certain functions.  I would not call myself a spokesman, but on certain issues, depending on the circumstances, I will speak for the native people.

He first campaigned for the Manitoba legislature in the 1973 provincial election, as an independent candidate.

Munroe served as vice-president of the Native Council of Canada in the 1970s, and unsuccessfully campaigned for its presidency in 1979.  He was identified served as Chief of Garden Hill in a 1982 article, (Globe and Mail, 7 January 1982), and was chief executive officer of the Sagkeeng First Nation in 1993 (Winnipeg Free Press, 16 August 1993).  Munroe was 49 years old at the time of the by-election (WFP, 11 September 1993).

He was director of the child and family services agency Ma Mawi Wi Chi Itata Centre in 1995, and supported efforts toward legal restitution for the victims of Canada's residential school system (WFP, 17 August 1995).  He was also co-chairman of the Winnipeg Aboriginal Coalition, and promoted the creation of an aboriginal "trade zone" in the city to promote economic stimulation (WFP, 13 November 1995).  In late 1996, he promoted a First Nations Bank of Canada (WFP, 12 December 1996).  He was elected to a two-year term on the Aboriginal Council of Winnipeg in July 1996, and was later chosen as the council's vice-president (WFP, 28 July and 22 November 1996).  He appears to have been re-elected in 1998, as he was still listed as council vice-president late in the year (WFP, 27 October 1998).

Munroe was listed in 1999 as CEO of Neeginan Development Corp., which promotes aboriginal and historic tourism in Winnipeg (National Post, 24 May 1999).  In 2001, he was a consultant with the Social Planning Council of Winnipeg (WFP, 27 June 2001).  He served on the Winnipeg Project Advisory Council in 2003-04.

He served as co-chair of the First Peoples National Party of Canada in 2005.

Footnotes

1990